Griswoldella is a monotypic genus of east African corinnid sac spiders containing the single species, Griswoldella aculifera. It was first described by C. R. Haddad in 2021, and it has only been found in Madagascar.

See also
 List of Corinnidae species

References

Further reading

Monotypic Corinnidae genera
Spiders of Madagascar